The Cato–Fair Haven Trail extends  from the Town of Cato to Fair Haven, New York. It was built along part of a line within the Auburn Division of the Lehigh Valley Railroad.

Parking 
In Cato there is a parking lot next to the town offices (a new building resembling the station that used to be on that site).  The sign there says "No Wheeled Vehicles" even though it encourages bicycling on the trail. In Fair Haven there is parking on the south side of NY 104A.

Maintenance 
Several bridges have been removed and replaced by ramps, or in one instance, a culvert. The trail is maintained by Cayuga County.

References

External links 
 Route of the trail

Protected areas of Cayuga County, New York